John Mackinnon Robertson  (14 November 1856 – 5 January 1933) was a prolific Scottish journalist, advocate of rationalism and secularism, and Liberal Member of Parliament for Tyneside from 1906 to 1918.

Robertson was best known as an advocate of the Christ myth theory.

Biography 
Robertson was born in Brodick on the Isle of Arran; his father moved the family to Stirling while he was still young, and he attended school there until the age of 13.  He worked first as a clerk and then as a journalist, eventually becoming assistant editor of the Edinburgh Evening News.

He wrote in February 1906 to a friend that he "gave up the 'divine'" when he was a teenager. His first contact with the freethought movement was a lecture by Charles Bradlaugh in Edinburgh in 1878. Robertson became active in the Edinburgh Secular Society, soon after. It was through the Edinburgh Secular Society that he met William Archer and became writer for the Edinburgh Evening News. He eventually moved to London to become assistant editor of Bradlaugh's paper National Reformer, subsequently taking over as editor on Bradlaugh's death in 1891. The National Reformer finally closed in 1893.  Robertson was also an appointed lecturer for the freethinking South Place Ethical Society from 1899 until the 1920s.

An advocate of the "New Liberalism," Robertson's political radicalism developed in the 1880s and 1890s, and he first stood for Parliament in 1895, failing to win Bradlaugh's old seat in Northampton as an independent radical liberal.  Robertson was a staunch free trader and his Trade and Tariffs (1908) "became a bible for free-traders pursuing the case for cheap food and the expansion of trade".

In 1915 he was appointed to the Privy Council.

At the 1918 United Kingdom general election, as a Liberal candidate he contested Wallsend, a constituency based largely on his Tyneside seat, but finished third.  He contested the 1923 United Kingdom general election as Liberal candidate for Hendon without success.

Robertson died in London in 1933.

Homer Smith has described Robertson as an "outstanding exponent of rationalism and one of the foremost scholars produced in England in the last six decades."

Electoral record

Political views 
Economically, Robertson has been described as an underconsumptionist, and he gave an early form, perhaps the earliest formal statement, of the paradox of thrift in his 1892 book The Fallacy of Saving. He was in favour of the payment of MPs, the Abolition of the House of Lords and the establishment of Adult Suffrage, including giving votes to women.

Christ myth theory
Robertson was an advocate of the Christ myth theory, and in several books he argued that Jesus was not a historical person, but was an invention by a first-century Jewish messianic cult of Joshua, whom he identifies as a solar deity. In Robertson's view, religious groups invent new gods to fit the needs of the society of the time. Robertson argued that a solar deity symbolized by the lamb and the ram had long been worshiped by an Israelite cult of Joshua and that this cult had then invented a new messianic figure, Jesus of Nazareth. Robertson argued that a possible source for the Christian myth may have been the Talmudic story of the executed Jesus Pandera which dates to 100 BC. He wrote that possible origins were: a would-be messiah who preached "a political doctrine subversive of the Roman rule, and to have thereby met his death"; and a "Galilean faith-healer with a local reputation [who] may have been slain as a human sacrifice at some time of social tumult".

Robertson considered the letters of Paul the earliest surviving Christian writings, but viewed them as primarily concerned with theology and morality, rather than historical details:

Robertson viewed references to the twelve apostles and the institution of the Eucharist as stories that must have developed later among gentile believers who were converted by Jewish evangelists like Paul.

Oxford theologian and orientalist Frederick Cornwallis Conybeare wrote a book titled, The Historical Christ; or, An investigation of the views of Mr. J. M. Robertson, Dr. A. Drews, and Prof. W. B. Smith (1913), directed against the Christ myth theory defended by the three authors.

Selected works 

 Modern Humanists (1891)
 Miscellanies (1898)
 History of Freethought in the Nineteenth Century, (1899)
  (1900) 
 Studies in Religious Fallacy (1900)
  (1902) 
 
  (1905, 2nd edition)
A Short History of Freethought: Ancient and Modern Volume 1, Volume 2 (1906)
 Rationalism (1912)
 The Baconian Heresy: A Confutation (1913)
 The Historical Jesus: A Survey of Positions (1916)
 The Jesus Problem: Restatement of the Myth Theory (1917)
Shakespeare and Chapman (1917)
 Short History of Morals (1920)
 Explorations (1923)
The Shakespeare Canon (1922–1932)
 Jesus and Judas (1927)
 A Short History of Christianity (third edition, 1931)

References

Sources

  (Reprinted (2004) Whitefish, MT: Kessinger Publishing )
  (Reprinted (2004) Whitefish, MT: Kessinger Publishing )

Further reading

External links
 
 
 
 

1856 births
1933 deaths
19th-century British journalists
19th-century British politicians
20th-century British writers
Scottish sceptics
British secularists
Christ myth theory proponents
Critics of Christianity
Freethought writers
Liberal Party (UK) MPs for English constituencies
Members of the Privy Council of the United Kingdom
Parliamentary Secretaries to the Board of Trade
People associated with Conway Hall Ethical Society
People from the Isle of Arran
Presidents of the Liberal Party (UK)
British radicals
Rationalists
Scottish atheists
Scottish journalists
Scottish magazine editors
UK MPs 1906–1910
UK MPs 1910
UK MPs 1910–1918
Victorian writers